Stephen Patrick Gethins (born 28 March 1976) is a former Scottish National Party (SNP) politician who served as the Member of Parliament (MP) for North East Fife from the 2015 general election, until he lost his seat at the 2019 general election to Wendy Chamberlain of the Liberal Democrats.

Background and education
Gethins was born in Glasgow and brought up in Perth. He was educated at Perth Academy. He graduated with a Bachelor of Laws degree from the University of Dundee in 1998, specialising in public international law. He also holds a Master of Research from the University of Kent. He worked in the NGO Sector specialising in peace-building, arms control and democracy in the Caucasus and the Balkans regions. He worked with NGO Links in Tbilisi focusing on the conflicts surrounding the breakaway entities in the South Caucasus such as South Ossetia, Abkhazia and Nagorno-Karabakh. He also worked for Saferworld on arms control, peace-building and democratisation in the former Soviet Union and Balkans.

Political career
Gethins was appointed a Special Adviser to Scotland's First Minister, Alex Salmond, advising on European and International Affairs as well as Rural Affairs, Energy and Climate Change and subsequently advised Nicola Sturgeon. He was a Political Advisor with the Committee of the Regions in the European Union, a position which saw him working with local authorities from across Europe. He also worked at Scotland Europa.

He was on the list of SNP candidates for the six Scottish seats in the 2014 European Parliament election, although only the first two SNP candidates were elected.

UK Parliament
In February 2015, he was selected by the local party members to contest the 2015 general election at the North East Fife constituency. He won 18,523 votes (a 40.9% share of the vote) and received a majority of 4,344 votes over the Liberal Democrat candidate, Tim Brett, who was selected after the retirement of the seat's long-term Lib Dem MP and former party leader, Sir Ming Campbell. In May 2015, the SNP made him their Spokesperson on Europe at Westminster. In July he was appointed as a member of the House of Commons Foreign Affairs Select Committee, the first SNP candidate to win the seat.

At the 2017 general election, Gethins was narrowly re-elected as the MP for North East Fife. He received 13,743 votes, giving him a very slim majority of just two votes over the Liberal Democrats; the joint-third smallest majority in British political history. This was confirmed after three re-counts before being declared. After the election, Gethins was promoted to the SNP Westminster frontbench team of Ian Blackford as the party's Spokesperson for International Affairs and Europe.

Despite increasing his share of the vote, he lost his seat at the 2019 general election to the Liberal Democrat candidate, Wendy Chamberlain who won by a majority of 1,316 votes. This made him the only SNP MP to lose their seat at the general election that year.

After Westminster
In July 2020, Gethins was announced as the chair of ‘eu+me’- a campaign for a close relationship between Scotland and the EU after Brexit.

References

External links 
 profile at University of St Andrews

 Official website
 

1976 births
21st-century Scottish politicians
Alumni of the University of Dundee
Alumni of the University of Kent
Academics of the University of St Andrews
Living people
Members of the Parliament of the United Kingdom for Fife constituencies
People educated at Perth Academy
People from Perth, Scotland
Scottish National Party MPs
Scottish special advisers
UK MPs 2015–2017
UK MPs 2017–2019